James Clarke White may refer to:
 James Clarke White (dermatologist) (1833–1916), American dermatologist and professor at Harvard Medical School
 James Clarke White (neurosurgeon) (died 1981), American neurosurgeon and professor at Harvard Medical School